Kırıkkale University is a university located in Kırıkkale, Turkey. It was established in 1992.

References

External links
Official Website

Kırıkkale University
1992 establishments in Turkey
State universities and colleges in Turkey
Educational institutions established in 1992
Kırıkkale